During the 2006–07 Spanish football season, Real Zaragoza competed in La Liga.

Season summary
Zaragoza finished 6th in La Liga, qualifying for the UEFA Cup. Key to the club's good form was Argentine striker Diego Milito, who scored 23 goals in the league, making him second top scorer in La Liga and third place in the European Golden Shoe.

First-team squad
Squad at end of season

Left club during season

References

Real Zaragoza
Real Zaragoza seasons